The Haymarket Conspiracy: Transatlantic Anarchist Networks is a 2012 book by historian Timothy Messer-Kruse on the Haymarket affair and the origins of American anarchism.

References

External links 
 

2012 non-fiction books
History books about anarchism
English-language books
Works about the Haymarket affair
University of Illinois Press books
History books about the United States
History books about the 19th century